Adolphe Appia (1 September 1862 – 29 February 1928), son of Red Cross co-founder Louis Appia, was a Swiss architect and theorist of stage lighting and décor.

Early life 
Adolphe Appia was raised in Geneva, Switzerland, in a "strictly Calvinistic home".:7 He attended boarding school at the Collège de Vevey starting in 1873 at the age of 11, where he remained until 1879.:7

He saw his first professional theatre production at the age of 16, when he attended a production of Charles Gounod's Faust.:8 He studied music at the Leipzig Conservatory (1882–83) and at a music school in Dresden (1886–90).:8

Career 
Appia is best known for his many scenic designs for Wagner’s operas.:7 He rejected painted two-dimensional sets for three-dimensional "living" sets because he believed that shade was as necessary as light to form a connection between the actor and the setting of the performance in time and space. Through the use of control of light intensity, colour and manipulation, Appia created a new perspective of scene design and stage lighting.

Directors and designers have both taken great inspiration from the work of Appia, whose design theories and conceptualizations of Wagner's operas have helped to shape modern perceptions of the relationship between the performance space and lighting. One of the reasons for the influence of Appia's work and theories, is that he was working at time when electrical lighting was just evolving. Another is that he was a man of great vision who was able to conceptualize and philosophize about many of his practices and theories.

Theories 
The central principle underpinning much of Appia's work is that artistic unity is the primary function of the director and the designer. Appia maintained that two dimensional set painting and the performance dynamics it created, was the major cause of production disunity in his time. He advocated three elements as fundamental to creating a unified and effective mise-en-scène:
 Dynamic and three dimensional movements by actors;
 perpendicular scenery;
 using depth and the horizontal dynamics of the performance space.
Appia saw light, space and the human body as malleable commodities which should be integrated to create a unified mise-en-scène. He advocated synchronicity of sound, light and movement in his productions of Wagner's operas and he tried to integrate corps of actors with the rhythms and moods of the music. Ultimately however, Appia considered light as the primary element which fused together all aspects of a production and he consistently attempted to unify musical and movement elements of the text and score to the more mystical and symbolic aspects of light. He often tried to have actors, singers and dancers start with a strong symbolic gesture or movement and end with another strong symbolic pose or gesture. In his productions, light was ever changing, manipulated from moment to moment, from action to action. Ultimately, Appia sought to unify stage movement and the use of space, stage rhythm and the mise-en-scène.

Appia was one of the first designers to understand the potential of stage lighting to do more than merely illuminate actors and painted scenery. His ideas about the staging of "word-tone drama", together with his own stagings of Tristan und Isolde (Milan, 1923) and parts of the Ring (Basle, 1924–25) have influenced later stagings, especially those of the second half of the 20th century.

For Appia and for his productions, the mise-en-scène and the totality or unity of the performance experience was primary and he believed that these elements drove movement and initiated action more than any thing else (Johnston, 1972). Appia's designs and theories went on to inspire many other theatre creators such as Edward Gordon Craig, Jacques Copeau and Wieland Wagner.

Works 
 L’œuvre d’art vivant. 1921
 La mise en scéne du théatre Wagnerien. Paris, 1895
 Musique et mise en scéne, 1897
See also the articles about Appia written by Prince Serge Wolkonsky (in Russian Wiki)

Filmography
 Adolphe Appia, Visionary of Invisible (1988), a film by Louis Mouchet

References

Bibliography
 Anderson, Ross. The Appian Way, AA Files Vol. 75 (December 2017):163-182.
 Bablet Denis, Bablet Marie-Louise. Adolphe Appia. 1862-1928. Actor – Space – Light – Pro Helvetia, Zurich and John Calder (Publishers) Ltd, London/Riverrun Press, New York.1982
 Beacham, R.C. Adolphe Appia: Theatre Artists (Directors in Perspective Series), Cambridge University Press, Cambridge, 1987.
 Brockett, O. History of the Theatre, Allyn and Bacon, Boston, 1994.
 Claire-Lise Dutoit, Music. Movement. Therapy. A Dalcroze Book. London, 1977.
 Wills, R. The Director in a Changing Theatre, Mayfield, Palo Alto, 1976.
 Adolphe Appia, Visionary of Invisible, a film by Louis Mouchet, 1988

External links 

 Walther Volbach Collection on Adolphe Appia. General Collection, Beinecke Rare Book and Manuscript Library, Yale University.

1862 births
1928 deaths
Architects from Geneva
Swiss scenic designers
Opera designers
Modernist theatre